KTEA (103.5 FM) is a commercial radio station that is licensed to Cambria, California and serves San Luis Obispo County. The station is owned by Adelman Broadcasting and broadcasts a Soft classic hits format.

History
KTEA first signed on November 9, 2003, with a big band/adult standards music format. The station was originally owned by James Robert Kampschroer. He chose the call sign KTEA because phonetically it resembles the name of his granddaughter Katy, who was born the same day the Federal Communications Commission (FCC) granted the station's license—July 18 of that year.

On August 27, 2012, KTEA flipped to soft adult contemporary with the branding "Magic 103.5", as Kampschroer leased the station to Post Rock Communications. The call sign changed to KMGQ. Less than two months later, Kampschroer re-assumed control of his station and restored the previous standards format. The station's call letters reverted to KTEA on November 20, 2012.

On March 31, 2014, Kampschroer sold KTEA to Robert Adelman's Adelman Broadcasting, Inc. for $200,000. On June 6, 2015, KTEA shifted its format from oldies to classic hits.

References

External links

TEA
Classic hits radio stations in the United States
Cambria, California
Mass media in San Luis Obispo County, California
Radio stations established in 2003
2003 establishments in California